The Heaven Sword and Dragon Saber is a Hong Kong television series adapted from Louis Cha's novel of the same title. The series was first broadcast on TVB Jade in Hong Kong in 1978.

Cast
 Note: Some of the characters' names are in Cantonese romanisation.

 Adam Cheng as Cheung Mo-kei
 Wong Tsung-chi as Cheung Mo-kei (young)
 Liza Wang as Chiu Man
 Angie Chiu as Chow Chi-yeuk
 Wong Wan-choi as Yeung Siu
 Sharon Yeung as Yeung Bat-fui / Kei Hiu-fu
 Idy Chan as Siu-chiu
 Ha Yu as Cheung Tsui-san
 Gigi Wong as Yan So-so
 Chong Man-ching as Yan Lei
 Shih Kien as Tse Shun
 Wong Sun as Yu-yeung Prince
 Lok Kung as Hung-kin
 Kong Ngai as Sing Kwan
 Cheung Ying-choi as Yu Toi-ngam
 Kent Cheng as Sack Monk
 Liu Wai-hung as Cheung Chung-kai
 Tam Chuen-hing as Mok Sing-kuk
 Lam Wai-to as Yan Lei-ting
 Kwan Hoi-san as Cheung Sam-fung
 Kwan Kin as Yu Lin-chow
 Lam Man-wai as Sin-yu Tung
 Tsang Chor-lam as Tong Man-leung
 Chow Kit as Hung-chi
 Ho Pik-kin as Chu Cheung-ling
 Siu Leung as Ho Tai-chung
 Cheng Siu-ping as Ban Suk-han
 Kong Ho-oi as Ding Man-kwan
 Sheung-koon Yuk as Mit-juet
 Cheung Wut-yau as Sung Yun-kiu
 Pui Wun as Ching-yuen
 Kwan Cung as Sung Ching-shu
 Ye Fung as Chow Din
 Ma Heng-sang as Iron-Crowned Taoist
 Kam Hing-yin as Lang Hin
 Tam Kam-wah as Pang Ying-yuk
 Wong Bing-lun as Yan Ye-wong
 Bak Man-biu as Yan Tin-cheng
 Cheung Sang as Hung-man
 Ng Yuen-chun as Chung Wai-hap
 Yeung Yin-tong as Wai Yat-siu
 Lai Wing-keung as Seung Yu-chun
 Ko Kong as Luk Cheung-hak
 Tsui Kwong-lam as Ha Bat-yung
 Lee Do-yu as Fan Yiu
 Si Ming as Golden Flower Granny
 Lung Tin-sang as Chan Yau-leung
 Ma Hon-yuen as Yeung Ding-tin
 Cheng Nai-kan as Chu Yun-cheung
 Lam Yan-yan as Yellow Dress Maiden
 Kiu Hung as Wong Bo-bo
 Wong Bak-man as Tsui Tat
 Ray Lui

External links

1970s Hong Kong television series
1978 Hong Kong television series debuts
1978 Hong Kong television series endings
TVB dramas
Hong Kong wuxia television series
Television shows based on The Heaven Sword and Dragon Saber
Television series set in the Yuan dynasty
Sequel television series
Television series about orphans
Television shows about rebels
Television shows set on islands
Cantonese-language television shows